The Journal for the Study of the Old Testament (JSOT) is a peer-reviewed academic journal covering the field of Biblical studies. The editors-in-chief are David Shepherd (Trinity College Dublin) and Lena-Sofia Tiemeyer (Örebro School of Theology). It was established in 1976 and is published by SAGE Publications.

The journal is associated with the Sheffield school approach, which engages in literary readings of the final form of the biblical text.

Abstracting and indexing 
The journal is abstracted and indexed in:
 Academics Premier
 ATLA Religion Database
 Index theologicus
 New Testament Abstracts
 Religion & Philosophy Collection

References

External links 
 

SAGE Publishing academic journals
English-language journals
Biblical studies journals
Publications established in 1976
5 times per year journals